Ladies Before Gentlemen was an American television series that was broadcast on the DuMont Television Network between February and May 1951. It was a panel show which featured discussions of male and female perspectives on a variety of topics. Moderated by Ken Roberts, the program aired from February 28 to May 2, 1951. The series was produced by Henry Misrock.

Format
The program's game show structure pitted a female guest against a six-man panel, with the guest defending the woman's point of view on a topical issue. Panelists included Harvey Stone, Dick Joseph, Fred Robbins, Robert Sylvester, and John Kullers.

See also
List of programs broadcast by the DuMont Television Network
List of surviving DuMont Television Network broadcasts

References

Bibliography
David Weinstein, The Forgotten Network: DuMont and the Birth of American Television (Philadelphia: Temple University Press, 2004) 
Alex McNeil, Total Television, Fourth edition (New York: Penguin Books, 1980) 
Tim Brooks and Earle Marsh, The Complete Directory to Prime Time Network TV Shows, Third edition (New York: Ballantine Books, 1964)

External links
Ladies Before Gentlemen at IMDB
DuMont historical website

DuMont Television Network original programming
1950s American game shows
1951 American television series debuts
1951 American television series endings
Black-and-white American television shows
Lost television shows